The 2006–07 A1 Grand Prix of Nations, New Zealand is an A1 Grand Prix race, held on 21 January 2007 at Taupo Motorsport Park, New Zealand. The sixth race in the 2006–07 A1 Grand Prix season and the first meeting held at the circuit.

Report

Practice

Qualifying

Sprint race

Main race

Results

Qualification

Sprint Race results
The Sprint Race took place on Sunday, 21 January 2007

Feature Race results
The Feature Race took place on Sunday, 21 January 2007

Total Points

Total points awarded:

 Fastest Lap: Germany

References

New Zealand
A1 Grand Prix
Taupō